Konstantin Volkov (born 7 February 1985) is a Russian professional ice hockey player who is currently an unrestricted free agent. He most recently played with Avtomobilist Yekaterinburg in the Kontinental Hockey League (KHL). He was selected by the Toronto Maple Leafs in the 4th round (125th overall) of the 2003 NHL Entry Draft.

Career statistics

References

External links

1985 births
Living people
Avtomobilist Yekaterinburg players
HC Dynamo Moscow players
HC Lada Togliatti players
HC MVD players
Russian ice hockey right wingers
Ice hockey people from Saint Petersburg
Toronto Maple Leafs draft picks
HC Vityaz players